The Good Old Stuff: Adventure SF in the Grand Tradition is an anthology of science fiction short works edited by Gardner Dozois. It was first published in trade paperback by St. Martin's Griffin in December 1998, with an ebook following from the same publisher in December 2013. It was combined with its companion anthology The Good New Stuff in the omnibus edition The Good Stuff, issued by the Science Fiction Book Club in January 1999. It has also been translated into Italian.

Summary
The book collects sixteen novellas, novelettes and short stories by various science fiction authors originally published from the late 1940s through the early 1970s, together with a preface by the editor.

Contents
"Preface" (Gardner Dozois)
"The Rull" (A. E. van Vogt)
"The Second Night of Summer" (James H. Schmitz)
"The Galton Whistle" (L. Sprague de Camp)
"The New Prime" (Jack Vance)
"That Share of Glory" (C. M. Kornbluth)
"The Last Days of Shandakor" (Leigh Brackett)
"Exploration Team" (Murray Leinster)
"The Sky People" (Poul Anderson)
"The Man in the Mailbag" (Gordon R. Dickson)
"Mother Hitton's Littul Kittons" (Cordwainer Smith)
"A Kind of Artistry" (Brian W. Aldiss)
"Gunpowder God" (H. Beam Piper)
"Semley's Necklace" (Ursula K. Le Guin)
"Moon Duel" (Fritz Leiber)
"The Doors of His Face, the Lamps of His Mouth" (Roger Zelazny)
"Mother in the Sky With Diamonds" (James Tiptree, Jr.)

Notes

1998 anthologies
Science fiction anthologies
Gardner Dozois anthologies
St. Martin's Press books